Gannis is a surname. Notable people with the surname include:

Carla Gannis, American artist
Cassie Gannis (born 1991), American stock car racing driver

See also
Ragheed Ganni (1972–2007), Iraqi Chaldean Catholic priest

English-language surnames